Raoul Kenne (born 25 March 1994) is a Cameroonian footballer who plays for Belgian club Patro Eisden as a right back.

Club career
An Aspire Academy Senegal branch youth graduate, he joined Eupen in 2012. Kenne made his professional debut in a 4–2 loss to Waasland-Beveren on 15 October 2016. However, he was forced to stop training due to cardiac arrhythmia in October 2016, and hasn't made an appearance with the first team since.

International career
Kenne is a one-time youth international for the Cameroon U23s in 2015.

References

External links
Profile at Soccerway
Kenne Eurosport Profile
Kenne Maxifoot Profile

1994 births
Living people
People from South Region (Cameroon)
Cameroonian footballers
Cameroonian expatriate footballers
Cameroon youth international footballers
Association football defenders
Belgian Pro League players
Challenger Pro League players
K.A.S. Eupen players
RFC Liège players
K. Patro Eisden Maasmechelen players
Expatriate footballers in Belgium
Cameroonian expatriate sportspeople in Belgium
Aspire Academy (Senegal) players